Elmano Férrer (born August 1, 1942) is a Brazilian politician and lawyer. He has represented Piauí in the Federal Senate since 2015. Previously he was mayor of Teresina from 2010 to 2013. He is a member of Progressistas (PP).

See also
 List of mayors of Teresina

References

|-

Living people
1942 births
Members of the Federal Senate (Brazil)
Mayors of places in Brazil
People from Teresina
Piauí politicians
20th-century Brazilian lawyers
People from Ceará
Progressistas politicians
Federal University of Ceará alumni